Awatoto is a coastal suburb area located near Napier, Hawke's Bay, New Zealand. 

The New Zealand Ministry for Culture and Heritage gives a translation of "stream for hauling canoes" for Awatōtō.

Awatoto had a population of 309 at the 2013 New Zealand census, a decrease of 48 people since the 2006 census. There were 153 males and 156 females. 83.2% were European/Pākehā, 23.2% were Māori, 1.1% were Pacific peoples and 4.2% were Asian.

History
Ngāti Kahungunu occupied the area prior to colonisation. Waitangi Mission Station was set up on the north bank of the Ngaruroro River for the Church Missionary Society by William Colenso in 1844. Awatoto was included in the sale of  the  Ahuriri Block for £1,500 on 17 November 1851. A soap works was set up in 1883. It burnt down in 1910 and 1915 and was flooded in 1917. Settlement of the area dates from the late 1800s, although population was minimal until the post-war years. Meeanee developed as a small settlement in the 1940s and 1950s, servicing the surrounding dairy farms. The population increased from the mid-1990s, a result of new dwellings being added to the area.

Railway station 
Awatoto railway station was near Awatoto Road, opened on 20 June 1884. In 1880 authority was sought for £45 to be spent building a station and platform at Awatoto. It was a flag station, on the first  section of the Palmerston North–Gisborne Line, which opened on 12 October 1874, from Napier to Hastings. The line was built by international contractors John Brogden and Sons. They organised the first train carrying passengers from Napier to Waitangi on Tuesday 30 June 1874.

By 1896 Awatoto had a shelter shed, platform, cart approach and a passing loop for 18 wagons, extended to 23 in 1898, 45 in 1911 and 100 in 1954. In 1914 it became a tablet station and a railway house was built for the tablet man. In 1972 a new crossing loop was built nearer Waitangi bridge. On 31 January 1982 Awatoto closed to goods, except in wagon loads, and to passengers. It closed completely on 22 September 1986. Only a single track now runs through the former station site.

Demographics
Awatoto is in five SA1 statistical areas, which cover . The SA1 areas are part of the Meeanee-Awatoto statistical area.

Awatoto had a population of 795 at the 2018 New Zealand census, an increase of 234 people (41.7%) since the 2013 census, and an increase of 444 people (126.5%) since the 2006 census. There were 300 households, comprising 393 males and 402 females, giving a sex ratio of 0.98 males per female, with 132 people (16.6%) aged under 15 years, 123 (15.5%) aged 15 to 29, 360 (45.3%) aged 30 to 64, and 177 (22.3%) aged 65 or older.

Ethnicities were 86.4% European/Pākehā, 14.0% Māori, 2.6% Pacific peoples, 5.7% Asian, and 2.3% other ethnicities. People may identify with more than one ethnicity.

Although some people chose not to answer the census's question about religious affiliation, 52.5% had no religion, 36.2% were Christian, 0.4% had Māori religious beliefs, 0.4% were Hindu, 0.4% were Buddhist and 3.0% had other religions.

Of those at least 15 years old, 129 (19.5%) people had a bachelor's or higher degree, and 93 (14.0%) people had no formal qualifications. 132 people (19.9%) earned over $70,000 compared to 17.2% nationally. The employment status of those at least 15 was that 366 (55.2%) people were employed full-time, 84 (12.7%) were part-time, and 18 (2.7%) were unemployed.

Geography
Awatoto is on a flood plain, separated from the Pacific Ocean by a shingle spit, just north of where the Clive, Ngaruroro and Tutaekuri River estuaries meet Hawke Bay. Until the 1931 earthquake the Tutaekuri flowed north to Ahuriri Lagoon, but a diversion was built from 1934. The Heretaunga Plains Flood Control Scheme, with stop banking, pumps and gravel and river mouth management, helps control floodwaters, but they can still reach the underside of bridges, requiring closures.

State Highway 51 (until 1 August 2019 it was SH2) passes through Awatoto, along the coastline between Napier and Hastings. A cycleway opened from Bluff Hill to Awatoto in 2004.

Waitangi bridges 
Both road and railway cross the river estuary. From about 1861 a road ran along the beach, with a punt to cross the estuary. Following sea erosion of the beach, a new bridge was built in 1865. Undermined piles closed the bridge in 1867. It was rebuilt in 1897. The bridge was closed for a fortnight in 1905, when temporary piles gave way under a traction engine. Spans washed out in a 1918 flood. It collapsed under 2 trucks in 1928. Four piers were undermined in May 1938, closing the bridge until September.

Waitangi Regional Park 
A  wetland was re-established in 2019. Birds in the area include herons, spoonbills, godwits, and gannets.

Fertiliser factory 
Just to the north of the wetland is the largest superphosphate factory in the country, producing around 250,000 tonnes a year. It is Napier port’s largest importer. Rinse water from a boiler water treatment plant is discharged into the estuary. In 2020 aluminium, cadmium, copper, chromium, zinc, fluoride, nitrate and nickel levels in the drain were above ANZECC (2000) trigger levels.

Suburb
Awatoto is partly an industrial area. Paua Fresh Ltd is an abalone farm in Awatoto, Napier. The facility is currently producing 6,000 kg annually, and sells live abalone throughout New Zealand, and can also supply frozen product if requested. The coast at Awatoto is mostly used for fishing. Water activities do take place at the Awatoto river mouth just south of the industrial area. Awatoto is the site of water extraction and bottling.

References

Beaches of the Hawke's Bay Region
Suburbs of Napier, New Zealand
Populated places around Hawke Bay